Frasi is an Italian surname. Notable people with the surname include:

Franco Frasi (1928–2009), Italian footballer
Giulia Frasi ( 1730–1772), Italian opera singer

Italian-language surnames